Son of Oi! is a 1983 punk compilation album, released by Syndicate Records. It is 5th in the Oi! compilation series.

Track listing
Side One - Arthur's Side
 "Chip on my Shoulder" - Cock Sparrer 
 "Onwards" - Kraut 
 "Generation Landslide" - Prole! 
 "The Young Conservatives" - Garry Johnson 
 "Tomorrow's Whirl" - Paranoid Pictures 
 "Jobs Not Jails" - The Gonads 
 "Violent Playground" - Clockwork Destruction 
 "Joe Public" - Phil Sexton & Mick Turpin
 "Herpes in Seattle" - Alaska Cowboys 
 "Lager Top Blues" - Gary & The Gonads 
 "Made in England" - Terry McCann 
 "6.27 to London" - Mick Turpin 
Side Two - Terry's Side
 "Sing Something Swindle" - The Orgasm Guerillas 
 "Andy Is a Corporatist/Mindless Version" - Attila/Newtown Neurotics 
 "On the Streets" - 4-Skins 
 "Boy About Town" - Garry Johnson 
 "Out in the Cold" - The Business 
 "Make Mine Molotov" - Maniac Youth
 "I Understand (Live)" - The Angelic Upstarts 
 "Manifestoi!" - Oi! The Robot 
 "Top of the Pops" - Phil Sexton 
 "This Is Your Life" - Vicious Rumours 
 "Jerusalem" - L.O.L.S. Choir 
 "Beano" - Oxo's Midnight Stumblers

See also
Oi! The Album
Strength Thru Oi!
Carry On Oi!
Oi! Oi! That's Yer Lot!

Oi! albums
1983 compilation albums
Punk rock compilation albums